Jay Joseph Wiseman (born 1949) is an American BDSM author, educator, and expert legal witness. His most famous work is the book SM 101: A Realistic Introduction, which has somewhere in the area of 100,000 copies in print. It is also one of the Society of Janus' "Suggested Readings" regarding BDSM.

Greenery Press was founded in 1991 by author Janet Hardy, and in 1995 it merged with Jay Wiseman Books under the Greenery name. Hardy continues to run the company, while Wiseman continues to serve on the Press's board of directors.

After receiving royalties from the distribution of SM 101: A Realistic Introduction, he took the resultant funds and put himself through the New College of California School of Law. Later on, he became an adjunct professor at the same college. Although the college is now defunct, he is still listed through documentation as having taught "Advanced Legal Concepts" and "Legal Analysis".

Awards 
Jay Wiseman is an inductee of the Society of Janus Hall of Fame.

Works 
As of 2018, Wiseman has written 12 books and dozens of articles in magazines from Playboy to Redbook. A selected list includes:
 "An Essay about 'The Old Days'"
 "Emergency Training For SM Practitioners"
 Personal AD-ventures: How to Meet People Through Personal Ads
 Bay Area Sexuality Resources Guidebook
 SM 101: A Realistic Introduction, (1st ed, 1992), 2nd ed - Greenery Press, 2000. 
 Tricks—More than 125 Ways to Make Good Sex Better, 1992
 Tricks 2 -- Another 125 Ways to Make Good Sex Better, 1993
 Sex Toy Tricks: 125 Ways to Accessorize, 1995
 Supermarket Tricks—More than 125 Ways to Improvise Good Sex, 1996
 Jay Wiseman's Erotic Bondage Handbook, Greenery Press, 2000. .
 Dungeon Emergencies and Supplies
 Tricks to Please a Man

References

Further reading 
 WorldCat's Listing for Jay Wiseman 
 Rona Marech, "Greenery Press specializes in off-color topics", San Francisco Chronicle, October 19, 2001
 
 
 
 
 
 
 Mark Morris, "Missouri sex slave case may hinge on expert view of subculture", Kansas City Star, November 25, 2012

1949 births
American health and wellness writers
BDSM writers
Living people
Bondage riggers
People from New Albany, Indiana
Writers from San Francisco
American relationships and sexuality writers
American male non-fiction writers
Sex educators